Bill D. Fraser is a  politician in the province of New Brunswick, Canada. He was elected to the Legislative Assembly of New Brunswick in the 2006 election as the Liberal MLA for Miramichi-Bay du Vin.

In the 2014 election, he was re-elected in the redistributed riding of Miramichi.  He ran again in 2018, but was defeated by Michelle Conroy of the People's Alliance of New Brunswick.

References

Living people
Members of the Executive Council of New Brunswick
New Brunswick Liberal Association MLAs
21st-century Canadian politicians
Year of birth missing (living people)